NorgesGruppen ASA is a Norwegian grocery wholesaling group which also runs various retail outlets. With a 43,2 % market share in 2018, NorgesGruppen was the largest player in the Norwegian grocery retail market. The business dates back to 1866 when the wholesale activity started up in the name of Joh. Johannson.

Wholesale
ASKO is the wholesale branch of NorgesGruppen. The wholesale business is responsible for the total flow of goods from manufacturer to the market segments in grocery retail, industrial household and convenient stores  and consists of several regional companies, supplying groceries to NorgesGruppen's stores, in addition to a smaller number of stores outside of NorgesGruppen. ASKO also supplies groceries to Horeca (hotels, restaurants and caterer) customers in Norway. ASKO distributes a portfolio of 25,000 products and serves 14,000 clients from 13 warehouses, covering all parts of Norway.

In addition to ASKO we have the major grocery stores like; Kiwi, Meny, Joker, Spar, Jafs, Deli De Luca in addition to smaller stores.

Facts retail

 More than 1,800 grocery stores in 89 per cent of Norway's municipalities
 900 points of sale as retail convenience goods stores
 1,000 independent retailers
 41,000 employees representing 70 different nationalities
 1,200 business partners  NorgesGruppen's chain concepts (Kiwi, Meny, Spar, Joker) cover the full range from discount, via district stores, to supermarkets.

Brands 
NorgesGruppen owns various private labels, developed and managed by its subsidiary Unil AS. The private labels include:

 First Price
 Eldorado 
 Jacobs utvalgte 
 Fiskemannen
Folkets
 Fersk & ferdig
 Unik 
 Fauna
 Seidel

Sources 

Supermarkets of Norway
Wholesalers of Norway
Business services companies established in 1994
1994 establishments in Norway
Companies based in Oslo